Gerda Kratz (6 July 1926 – 13 March 2011) was a German sculptor.

Life 

Born in Pirmasens as the daughter of the shoe manufacturer , Gerda Rheinberger studied at the Meisterschule für das gestaltende Handwerk in Düsseldorf from 1946 to 1947 and was a private student of the sculptor Willi Hoselmann. In 1951, she married the sculptor , and in 1953 their son Thomas was born. The couple had a long-standing working relationship in their studio in Grafenberg and several of her husband's assistants worked alongside her at this time, with hard work during the day and happy parties at night. Small-format bronzes and terracottas were created during this period. There were also numerous journeys around the world. Since 1980, Kratz had her own studio in Gerresheim. She participated in exhibitions and competitions. Museum acquisitions and commissions for works in public spaces followed. Gerda Kratz had been a member of the Düsseldorf Women Artists' Association and the Künstlerverein Malkasten since 1984. When her husband died in 2000, she set up a foundation to care for his work and gave this foundation to Solingen, where her husband carried out several commissions and chaired the art advisory board for many years. On 13 March 2011, Kratz died in Düsseldorf at the age of 84. Kratz was buried at her husband's side in the Nordfriedhof in Düsseldorf.

Work 
Kratz war eine Gerresheimer Künstlerin, die hohes handwerkliches Können mit Ideen und Humor verbinden konnte. Ihre Arbeiten, beispielsweise Im Eimer, Im Café, Lovers and Big Egg Band, sind geprägt durch runde und knubbelige Figuren. Sie arbeitete in Stein, Bronze, Keramik, Holz und auch Kunststoff (Leguval).

Works 
 1983: Mutter Ey, Polyester for bronze, h. 50 cm
 1985: Ende der Freiheit, h. 49 cm
 1989: Endstation, Leguval, h. 145 cm.
 1996: Black Pieta, Leguval, h. 48 cm
 1997: Auf dem Korb, bronze, h. 25 cm
 Das Fenster, bronze, 33 × 36 cm
 Das Instrument, bronze 81 cm
 Heilige Ursula, ceramic, h. 100 cm
 Lesendes Paar, Bronze, Solingen.

Exhibitions 
 1962 until 1989: Wuppertal and Solingen B.K.G.
 from 1984: VDK in Düsseldorf, Stadtmuseum, Kunstpalast, Zollhalle, Kaarst, Mettmann, Welver, Bonn Frauenmuseum
 from 1984: KVM Düsseldorf, Berlin, Moskau, Luzern
 1986: Angermund
 1989: Groningen, Castorp, Freinsheim
 1990: Pirmasens
 1996, 1999, 2002: Hilden
 2002: Melanchthon Gemeinde, Düsseldorf-Rath

Awards 
Kratz was awarded the Order of Merit of North Rhine-Westphalia on 2 September 1987.

References

Further reading 
 Andreas Klimt (ed.): Kürschners Handbuch der Bildenden Künstler: Deutschland, Österreich, Schweiz. De Gruyter, Berlin 2007, .

External links 
 Gerda Kratz, Künstlerleben in Düsseldorf, in Künstlerverzeichnis, Kulturamt Landeshauptstadt Düsseldorf

20th-century German sculptors
German women sculptors
Members of the Order of Merit of North Rhine-Westphalia
1926 births
2011 deaths
People from Pirmasens
Folkwang University of the Arts alumni